Design of a Decade: 1986–1996 is a video compilation released by American R&B/pop singer Janet Jackson.

Release information
Released on October 10, 1995, it was Jackson's second compilation of music videos produced under her then-label A&M Records. The videos featured were produced for singles from her albums Control, Janet Jackson's Rhythm Nation 1814 and the first single from janet., "That's the Way Love Goes". The release tied in with her first audio greatest hits compilation Design of a Decade: 1986–1996. The video was released on VHS and Laserdisc, and re-released on DVD in the US on December 4, 2001.

Track listing

Certifications

Release history

References

Janet Jackson video albums
1995 video albums
Music video compilation albums
1995 compilation albums
A&M Records video albums